Radek Šlouf (born 30 October 1994) is a Czech sprint canoeist. He competed in the men's K-2 1000 metres event at the 2020 Summer Olympics and won a bronze medal.

References

External links
 

1994 births
Living people
Czech male canoeists
Olympic canoeists of the Czech Republic
Canoeists at the 2020 Summer Olympics
Place of birth missing (living people)
Olympic bronze medalists for the Czech Republic
Medalists at the 2020 Summer Olympics
Olympic medalists in canoeing
ICF Canoe Sprint World Championships medalists in kayak